Discrimination testing is a technique employed in sensory analysis to determine whether there is a detectable difference among two or more products. The test uses a group of assessors (panellists) with a degree of training appropriate to the complexity of the test to discriminate from one product to another through one of a variety of experimental designs. Though useful, these tests typically do not quantify or describe any differences, requiring a more specifically trained panel under different study design to describe differences and assess significance of the difference.

Statistical basis
The statistical principle behind any discrimination test should be to reject a null hypothesis (H0) that states there is no detectable difference between two (or more) products. If there is sufficient evidence to reject H0 in favor of the alternative hypothesis, HA: There is a detectable difference, then a difference can be recorded. However, failure to reject H0 should not be assumed to be sufficient evidence to accept it. H0 is formulated on the premise that all of the assessors guessed when they made their response. The statistical test chosen should give a probability value that the result was arrived at through pure guesswork. If this probability is sufficiently low (usually below 0.05 or 5%) then H0 can be rejected in favor of HA.

Tests used to decide whether or not to reject H0 include binomial, χ2 (Chi-squared), t-test etc.

Types of test
A number of tests can be classified as discrimination tests. If it's designed to detect a difference then it's a discrimination test. The type of test determines the number of samples presented to each member of the panel and also the question(s) they are asked to respond to.

Schematically, these tests may be described as follows; A & B are used for knowns, X and Y are used for different unknowns, while (AB) means that the order of presentation is unknown:
Paired comparison XY or (AB) – two unknown samples, known to be different, test is which satisfies some criterion (X or Y); unlike the others this is not an equality test.
Duo-trio AXY – one known, two unknown, test is which unknown is the known (X = A or Y = A)
Triangle (XXY) – three unknowns, test is which is odd one out (Y = 1, Y = 2, or Y = 3).
ABX ABX – two knowns, one unknown, test is which of the knowns the unknown is (X = A or X = B).
Duo-trio in constant reference mode (AB)X – three unknowns, where it is stated that the first two are different, but which is which is not identified, test is which of the first two the third is (X = 1 or X = 2).

Paired comparison
In this type of test the assessors are presented with two products and are asked to state which product fulfils a certain condition. This condition will usually be some attribute such as sweetness, sourness, intensity of flavor, etc. The probability for each assessor arriving at a correct response by guessing is

Advantages
Minimum number of samples required. Most straightforward approach when the question is 'Which sample is more ?"

Disadvantages
Need to know in advance the attribute that is likely to change. Not statistically powerful with large panel sizes required to obtain sufficient confidence (citation?).

Duo-trio
The assessors are presented with three products, one of which is identified as the control. Of the other two, one is identical to the control, the other is the test product. The assessors are asked to state which product more closely resembles the control.

The probability for each assessor arriving at a correct response by guessing is

Advantages
Quick to set up and execute. No need to have prior knowledge of nature of difference.

Disadvantages
Not statistically powerful therefore relatively large panel sizes required to obtain sufficient confidence.

Triangle
The assessors are presented with three products, two of which are identical and the other one different. The assessors are asked to state which product they believe is the odd one out.

The probability for each assessor arriving at a correct response by guessing is

Advantages
Can be quick to execute and offers greater power than paired comparison or duo-trio.

Disadvantages
Error might occur:
 Expectation error: This error occurs when the panelists are given more than enough information about the test before actually doing it. Too many facts or hints cause panelists to make a judgment on expectation rather than intuition. For this reason it is important to provide only the facts necessary to complete the test (e.g. Random three digit codes on the samples because people generally associate "1" or "A" with "best").
 Stimulus error: It is important to mask all differences between the two samples. This is because people generally aspire to get the correct answer and any visible differences will "stimulate" error. Lighting, uniformity of size and shape of samples, the use of transparent or opaque cups, etc. must all be taken into account if this error is to be avoided.
 Logical error: can cause panelists to evaluate samples according to particular qualities because they appear to be logically associated with other characteristics. To avoid this error, uniformity of appearance and disguising of disparities must be dealt with before the experiment takes place.
 Leniency error: Error based on the panelists' opinions of the researcher(s). Tests must be conducted in an organized, professional approach.
 Suggestion effect: Panelists can influence each other by voicing their opinions or making known their reactions. Silence and separation of panelists by booth-like partitions help decrease the suggestion effect enormously.
 Positional Bias (order effect): Usually the middle sample is chosen as odd. This is common in the triangle test, especially when the samples look close to identical. This can be avoided by presenting the samples randomly (e.g. in a triangle shape so that there is no middle sample).
 Contrast effect and convergence error: The juxtaposition of two noticeably diverse samples commonly causes the panelists to exaggerate the contrasts, hence the contrast effect. But this can also incur the opposite effect, whereby a significant difference can camouflage the more minute unlikeness — the convergence error. In order to correct and prevent these errors, there must be randomized arrangements of samples for each panelist, so as to balance both effects.
 Central tendency error: Occurs when the panelists rate a sample mid-range, to avoid extremes. Consequently, results may suggest that samples are more comparable than they actually are. This becomes apparent especially when the panelist is not accustomed with the products or test procedure. Prevention of this flaw can be achieved by acquainting panelists with the test approach and products and by randomizing the order of arrangement of samples.
 Motivation: Motivation of panel members affects their sensory acuity. It is therefore important to maintain the interest of the panelists. This can be achieved just by conducting the experiment in a professional, controlled manner, or even by offering a report of their results. Usually trained panelists are more motivated than those who are not.

There are many other errors which can occur but the above are the main possible errors. It is evident from the above information that randomization, control and professional conduct of the experiment are essential for obtaining the most accurate results.

Important

Used to assist research and development in formulating and reformulating products. Using the triangle design to determine if a particular ingredient change, or a change in processing, creates a detectable difference in the final product. Triangle taste testing is also used in quality control to determine if a particular production run (or production from different factories) meets the quality-control standard (i.e., is not different from the product standard in a triangle taste test using discriminators).

ABX

The assessors are presented with three products, two of which are identified as reference A and alternative B, the third is unknown X, and identical to either A or B. The assessors are asked to state which of A and B the unknown is; the test may also be described as "matching-to-sample", or "duo-trio in balanced reference mode" (both knowns are presented as reference, rather than only one).

ABX testing is widely used in comparison of audio compression algorithms, but less used in food science.

ABX testing differs from the other listed tests in that subjects are given two known different samples, and thus are able to compare them with an eye towards differences – there is an "inspection phase". While this may be hypothesized to make discrimination easier, no advantage has been observed in discrimination performance in ABX testing compared with other testing methods.

Duo-trio in constant reference mode 
Like triangle testing, but third is known to not be the odd one out. Intermediate between ABX (where which of the first is which – which is control, which is proposed new one – is stated), and triangle, where any of the three could be out.

Degree of difference (DoD)

Signal Detection Theory

Experimental design

Notes and references 

Nonverbal communication
Psychophysics
Product testing